is a former international table tennis player from Japan.

Table tennis career
She won a bronze medal at the 1973 World Table Tennis Championships in the women's doubles with Tomie Edano.

She also won three Asian Championship medals.

See also
 List of table tennis players
 List of World Table Tennis Championships medalists

References

Japanese female table tennis players
World Table Tennis Championships medalists
Living people
Year of birth missing (living people)